Musa Kassim Omer is a Somali Surgeon and politician. He was the Minister of Commerce, Industries and Tourism of Somaliland between May 2014 and August 2016.

Personal life
Omer was born in Gabiley, situated in the former British Somaliland protectorate. He spent his childhood in the town and Djibouti. He hails from the Isaaq clan.

In 1980, Omer earned a Doctor of Medicine from the Somali National University in Mogadishu.

Career
Omer previously served as the WHO Emergency and Humanitarian Officer for Somalia. He was also the Executive Director of the Somaliland National AIDS Commission (SOLNAC).
In May 2014, Omer was appointed Minister of Commerce and International Investment of the northwestern Somaliland region of Somalia and he has been sacked in early 2016, after the Kulmiye Conference in the late of 2015.

References

Living people
Somalian politicians
Somali National University alumni
People from Maroodi Jeex
Year of birth missing (living people)
Government ministers of Somaliland